The 2014 Auburn Tigers softball team is an American softball team, representing the Auburn University for the 2014 NCAA softball season. This is Clint Myers first season as the Auburn Tigers softball head coach. The Auburn Tigers play their home games at Jane B. Moore Field.

Auburn made it back to the Regionals, before falling to Minnesota in the final game of Regionals.

Roster

2014 Auburn Tigers Softball Roster

Schedule

Season Notes
First Year under new staff (with Clint Myers as head coach)
Auburn returned to NCAA Regionals
Jenna Abbot hit walk off home run versus Minnesota in game 1 to force a winner take all game 2
Kasey Cooper started all 62 games as a freshman and led the team with a .418 batting average
Lexi Davis led the team with an ERA of 2.89
Austyn West led the team in Fielding Percentage but did not return to the team in 2015 for unknown reasons

References

Auburn
Auburn Tigers softball seasons